Armstrong Inya Echezolachuku Oko-Flex (born 2 March 2002) is an Irish professional footballer who plays as a winger for Premier League club West Ham United and the Republic of Ireland  under-19 national team

Club career
Oko-Flex was born in Dublin and started out playing with a local academy, Tolka Rovers, then St Kevin's Boys before being spotted by Arsenal scout Liam Brady, who had also come through the St Kevin's, with Oko-Flex then signing for the London club. He joined Celtic on a three-year deal from Arsenal in September 2018. He made his first team debut for the club as a substitute against Hibernian in January 2021.

West Ham United 
On 25 June 2021, Oko-Flex joined West Ham United on a two-year contract with an option for a third year.

On 16 August 2021, Oko-Flex scored a hat-trick in his Premier League 2 debut against his boyhood club Arsenal in a 6–1 home win. On 15 December 2021, Oko-Flex was an unused substitute for West Ham's Premier League fixture at the Emirates Stadium, a match won 2–0 by Arsenal. This was the first time he had made a first-team squad for the club. Oko-Flex made his debut for West Ham United on 25 August 2022 coming on as an 82nd minute substitute for Manuel Lanzini in a 3–0 away win against Viborg in the second leg of a play-off round game in the 2022–23 UEFA Conference League.

Swansea City (loan) 
On 30 August 2022, Oko-Flex joined Swansea City on loan for the remainder of the 2022-23 season. He was recalled from his loan in January 2023.

International career
Oko-Flex was called up to the Republic of Ireland U21 squad for the first time in November 2021, for their 2023 UEFA European Under-21 Championship qualifiers against Italy & Sweden.

Career statistics

Personal life
Oko-Flex is the son of the Nigerian-Irish community organiser Reginald Oko-Flex Inya.

References

External links
 Profile on Soccerway

2002 births
Living people
Association football midfielders
Black Irish sportspeople
Irish people of Nigerian descent
Irish sportspeople of African descent
Irish expatriate sportspeople in England
Republic of Ireland association footballers
Republic of Ireland expatriate association footballers
Republic of Ireland youth international footballers
Association footballers from Dublin (city)
Celtic F.C. players
Scottish Professional Football League players
Expatriate footballers in Scotland
Irish expatriate sportspeople in Scotland
West Ham United F.C. players
Swansea City A.F.C. players
English Football League players